BET Her (formerly Centric) is an American basic cable television network owned by Paramount Media Networks. The network is a spin-off of BET with a focus on general entertainment targeting African-American women.

The channel originally launched in 1996 as BET on Jazz, a spin-off from BET with a focus on jazz music programming targeting African Americans. In 2006, the network was re-positioned as BET J, which carried a broader array of music programming of interest to the demographic (accompanying its sister soul and hip-hop-oriented digital networks). In 2009, the network relaunched as Centric, with a focus on lifestyle and music programming targeting an upscale African-American audience. In 2014, the network re-positioned its programming to target African-American women, and in 2017, re-branded under its current name.

As of February 2015, approximately 51,829,000 American households (44.5% of households with television) received the network.

History 

The channel launched on January 15, 1996, as BET on Jazz, as a spin-off channel to BET. In 2002, it was renamed BET Jazz. On March 1, 2006, the network was re-branded as BET J and the focus shifted from a pure jazz channel to a more general interest service. While jazz music still remained the stated primary focus, programming expanded to include a block of Caribbean-oriented programs as well as some R&B, neo soul, reggaetón and alternative hip hop. To a lesser extent, BET J also focused on go-go, electronica and alternative rock. Programs included My Two Cents with Keith Boykin, Bryonn Bain, Crystal McCarey Anthony and Staceyann Chin, The Best Shorts hosted by Abiola Abrams, Living the Life of Marley about Ky-Mani Marley, My Model is Better Than Your Model with Eva Pigford and The Turn On hosted by Charlotte Burley.

On April 24, 2009, network officials announced it would rebrand BET J as Centric, a new general entertainment network with lifestyle and music programming targeting "upscale" African-American adults. The new channel was considered to be a competitor to TV One, a similar network owned by radio broadcaster Radio One (now Urban One). Centric's initial lineup primarily featured programming sourced from other MTV networks and programming that had been previously announced for BET J. The network planned to launch more original programs in 2010, such as the reality series Keeping Up With The Joneses and Model City. The channel also picked up reruns of the music series Soul Train, and revived the Soul Train Music Awards. Centric launched on September 28, 2009; its launch day primetime programming featured a tribute to Michael Jackson.

At its 2014 upfronts, Viacom announced that it would re-position Centric as a network targeting African-American women. Included in the repositioning was a development deal with Queen Latifah's Flavor Unit Entertainment (which saw a fourth season renewal for its comedy-drama Single Ladies, moving from VH1). 

On September 25, 2017, Centric rebranded as BET Her, as part of an ongoing restructuring of Viacom's networks around its flagship brands.

Programming 
This is a list of programs broadcast by BET Her as of March 2023.

Current 
 Pitch
 Sister, Sister
 Sunday Best

Music Video Blocks 
 BET Her Playlist
 Lifted
 Morning Glow
 Reminisce
 Strictly R&B

BET Series & Specials 
 BET Awards Nomination Special
 BET Awards 
 BET Hip Hop Awards
 Black Girls Rock!
 Soul Train Music Awards

Former 

 227
 A Different World
 A Sunday Of Worship With Regina And Daniel
 According to Alex
 According To Him + Her
 Amen
 American Gangster
 Apollo Live
 Are We There Yet?
 Arise 360
 The A-Team
 Baldwin Hills
 Being
 Being Mary Jane
 The Bernie Mac Show
 BETX Turn Up Party Repeat (2015) (BET Experience highlights special)
 BET J Virtual Awards (2008)
 BET After Dark The BET Honors 
 BET Start BET Start Weekends The Book of Negroes The Brian McKnight Show The Boondocks (November 15 2010)
 Brothers (2009 TV series) Brothers to Brutha Centric's 20 to 1 Countdown Centric Celebrates Selma (2015) (special)
 Centric Comedy All-Stars (2013)
 Centric Hits (2009)
 Centric Live Comic View Community Impact Awards (2015)
 The Cosby Show CSI: NY Culture List Daddy's Girls Eve Everybody Hates Chris Fame Family Feud Family Matters Fantasia for Real The First Family Flick Centric Frankie & Neffe From the Bottom Up The Fresh Prince of Bel Air The Game Get Christie Love! Girlfriends Got 2B Real: The Diva Variety Show
 Half & Half 
 Harlem Heights Hell Date Hit the Floor (TV series) Homicide: Life on the Street The Hot 10 Countdown I Want to Work for Diddy In Living Color In The House Instant Mom It's a Mann's World The Jamie Foxx Show K. Michelle: My Life Keeping Up With The Joneses Keyshia Cole: All In Keyshia Cole: The Way It Is La La's Full Court Life Leading Women/Men Lens on Talent Let's Stay Together (TV series) Luther Lyric Cafe Malcolm & Eddie McDonald's 365 Black Awards Miami Vice Moesha Morning Cup (2014)
 Mr. Box Office My Wife and Kids New York Undercover The Parkers The Players' Awards 
 The Queen Latifah Show The Real (moved to Bounce TV after being cancelled from BET after three seasons) (day-after repeats)
 Real Husbands of Hollywood Reed Between the Lines Retro Centric (2009)
 Run's House Rising Icons The Salt-N-Pepa Show Scandal Single Ladies Smart Guy The Steve Harvey Show Soul Sessions The Soul Man Soul Train VH1 Soul Stage Soul Train Awards Nomination Special 
 1998 Soul Train Christmas Starfest 
 Splash The Steve Harvey Project T.I. & Tiny: The Family Hustle Tiny and Shekinah's Weave Trip UNCF An Evening of Stars Urban Livin' Videology Video Soul Video Vibrations The Wayans Bros. What Chilli Wants''

See also 

 aspireTV – an American digital cable and satellite channel owned by businessman and former basketball player Magic Johnson.
 Black Entertainment Television – The flagship American basic cable and satellite channel of the BET Networks, currently owned by Paramount Global, which launched in 1980 as the first television network devoted to programming targeting African-Americans.
 Bounce TV – an American digital multicast network owned by E. W. Scripps Company.

References

External links 
 

Television channels and stations established in 1996
English-language television stations in the United States
BET Networks
African-American television
African-American television networks